Wei Liqun is a Chinese politician.  He is the former director of the State Council Research Office and a former deputy director of the China National School of Administration.  He has also been a member of the 16th and 17th Central Committees of the Communist Party of China.

References

Living people
People's Republic of China politicians from Jiangsu
Politicians from Xuzhou
Chinese Communist Party politicians from Jiangsu
Year of birth missing (living people)